Akash Thosar (born 24 February 1994) is an Indian actor who appears in Marathi cinema and Bollywood. He is best known for his role as Parshya in the 2016 Marathi film Sairat. He was ranked eighth in The Times of India's Top 20 Most Desirable Men of Maharashtra in 2019.

Career 
Akash Thosar was born and raised in Pune, Maharashtra. A former wrestler, he made a debut in the film industry with Sairat in 2016 and received immense success with this film. Thosar later starred in the lead role in Mahesh Manjrekar’s Marathi movie FU: Friendship Unlimited in 2017.

In 2018, he starred in Netflix original Lust Stories, an anthology film, paired opposite Radhika Apte in the segment directed by Anurag Kashyap. In 2022, he was seen in Jhund directed by Nagraj Manjule. He was also cast in 1962: The War in the Hills as an army officer.

Filmography

Films

Web series

Awards and nominations

References

External links 

 

Marathi actors
Living people
People from Solapur district
1993 births
Indian male film actors
Filmfare Marathi Awards winners